Chamba is a Goat breed from the Himalayan region that has white and soft hair.

See also
List of goat breeds

References

Goat breeds
Goat breeds originating in India